OFw Helmut Missner (19 May 1921 – 12 September 1944) was a former Luftwaffe fighter ace and recipient of the Knight's Cross of the Iron Cross during World War II. Helmut Missner was credited with 82 arial victories all over the Eastern Front (World War II). In 1944 he was killed in action over Sagan Poland.

Career
Missner entered the Luftwaffe January 6, 1941. In 1942 he was transferred to I./JG 54. Based on his experience Missner was one of the instructors for the Luftwaffe. He was assigned to the Eastern Front and he had 82 kills. Missner was killed in action in Sagan also known as Żagań, Poland on September 12, 1944. It is thought that a lack of oxygen caused Missner to plunge from a high altitude and crash. Buried at Poznan Poland in a mass grave. 

Before his death he was recommended for promotion to Leutnant.

Awards
 German Cross October 17, 1944>
 Knight's Cross of the Iron Cross

See also
 List of Knight's Cross of the Iron Cross recipients (M)
 List of World War II aces from Germany
 List of World War II flying aces

References

Bibliography

1921 births
1944 deaths
Luftwaffe personnel killed in World War II
German World War II flying aces
Luftwaffe pilots
Military personnel from Stuttgart
Recipients of the Gold German Cross
Recipients of the Knight's Cross of the Iron Cross